Expo 1985 Plovdiv was an international exposition that took place from November 4-30, 1985 in Plovdiv, Bulgaria. The exhibition had the theme "The Achievements of Young Inventors". The specialized exhibition was the 24th held by the Bureau International des Expositions and the second held in Plovdiv. Another specialized exposition, Expo '85 in Tsukuba, Japan occurred the same year.

Facts
Participating countries: 73
Visitors: 1,000,000

References

External links
 1985 Plovdiv - Bureau International des Expositions

See also
List of world's fairs

November 1985 events in Europe
World's fairs in Bulgaria
History of Plovdiv
1985 in Bulgaria
Inventions